Imperial Noble Consort Wenjing, also known as Dowager Imperial Noble Consort Duankang (6 October 1873 – 24 September 1924), of the Manchu Bordered Red Banner Tatara clan, was a consort of the Guangxu Emperor.

Life

Family background
Imperial Noble Consort Wenjing's personal name was not recorded in history.

 Father: Changxu, served as the Right Vice Minister of Revenue
 Paternal grandfather: Yutai, served as the Viceroy of Shaan-Gan in 1851
 Paternal grandmother: Lady Gūwalgiya
 Mother: Lady Zhao
 Three brothers :
Youngest brother : Tatara Zhaoxu
Issue : Tan Yuling, Noble Consort Mingxian. Marries Aisin Gioro Puyi, Xuantong Emperor.
 Three elder sisters and one younger sister
 Fifth younger sister: Imperial Noble Consort Keshun (1876–1900)

Tongzhi era
The future Imperial Noble Consort Wenjing was born on the 15th day of the eighth lunar month in the 12th year of the reign of the Tongzhi Emperor, which translates to 6 October 1873 in the Gregorian calendar.

Guangxu era
On 26 February 1889, Lady Tatara entered the Forbidden City and was granted the title "Concubine Jin". Her younger sister, the future Imperial Noble Consort Keshun, entered the Forbidden City at the same time and was granted the title "Concubine Zhen".

The Jadeite Cabbage sculpture, which is now on display in Taiwan's National Palace Museum, is believed to be part of the dowry settlement. The Guangxu Emperor did not really like her and instead favoured her younger sister.

On 6 February 1894, Lady Tatara was elevated to "Consort Jin". In November 1894, Consort Jin's younger sister, Consort Zhen, was discovered to have abused her influence over the Guangxu Emperor by interfering in civil appointments. On 26 November 1894, Consort Jin was implicated and demoted along with her sister by Empress Dowager Cixi. The empress dowager also ordered the execution of a palace eunuch who collaborated with Consort Zhen. Zhirui, a cousin of the two consorts who served as an official, was banished from Beijing. On 29 May 1895, the two sisters were restored to their positions. However, Consort Zhen was placed under house arrest.

When the Eight-Nation Alliance invaded Beijing in 1900, the imperial court fled from the Forbidden City to Xi'an. They apparently forgot about Consort Jin and left her behind, but she was saved by a noble and brought to Xi'an later. Consort Zhen, on the other hand, died after being thrown into a well, allegedly on Empress Dowager Cixi's order.

When the imperial court returned to Beijing in 1902, the Qing dynasty had lost its influence.

Xuantong era
The Guangxu Emperor died on 14 November 1908, followed by Empress Dowager Cixi, who died one day after the emperor. Before her death, Cixi named Zaifeng's son, Puyi, as the new emperor. On 18 November 1908, Lady Tatara was elevated to Dowager Noble Consort Jin.

Puyi, the Last Emperor, had five other adoptive mothers in addition to his own biological mother, Youlan. Among the five, Empress Dowager Longyu ranked the highest while Dowager Noble Consort Jin ranked second. The other three, Dowager Imperial Noble Consort Zhuanghe, Dowager Imperial Noble Consort Jingyi and Dowager Imperial Noble Consort Ronghui were former consorts of the Tongzhi Emperor, the Guangxu Emperor's cousin and predecessor.

Republican era

In 1911, Empress Dowager Longyu signed the abdication documents on behalf of Puyi, bringing an end to the Qing dynasty. The empress dowager died on 22 February 1913, and Lady Tatara became the highest ranked woman in the palace. On 12 March 1913, Lady Tatara was elevated to "Dowager Imperial Noble Consort Duankang". In 1921, Puyi's birth mother, Youlan, committed suicide by swallowing opium after being publicly reprimanded by Lady Tatara for her son's misbehaviour.

Puyi wrote in his autobiography that Lady Tatara saw Empress Dowager Cixi as a role model even though Cixi was responsible for the death of her younger sister. Lady Tatara's strictness often angered the young emperor Puyi, but she softened her approach towards him after his birth mother died.

When the time came for Puyi to marry, Lady Tatara and Dowager Imperial Noble Consort Jingyi had an argument over who should be the empress. Consort Wenjing favoured Wanrong while Jingyi preferred Wenxiu. In Lady Tatara's opinion, Wenxiu was not beautiful enough to be empress and she came from a lesser family background as compared to Wanrong. Despite so, Puyi's first choice was Wenxiu, and this frustrated Lady Tatara. She held a discussion with other nobles and officials in the imperial court, and they succeeded in persuading Puyi to select Wanrong as his empress and to name Wenxiu as a consort.

Lady Tatara died on 24 September 1924 just before Puyi was forced to leave the Forbidden City.

Titles
 During the reign of the Tongzhi Emperor (r. 1861–1875):
 Lady Tatara (from 6 October 1873)
 During the reign of the Guangxu Emperor (r. 1875–1908):
 Concubine Jin (from 26 February 1889), fifth rank consort
 Consort Jin (from 6 February 1894), fourth rank consort
 Noble Lady Jin (from 26 November 1894), sixth rank consort
 Consort Jin (from 29 May 1895), fourth rank consort
 During the reign of the Xuantong Emperor (r. 1908–1912):
 Noble Consort Jin (from 18 November 1908), third rank consort
 During the years of the Republic of China (1912–1949):
 Imperial Noble Consort Duankang (from 12 March 1913), second rank consort
 Imperial Noble Consort Wenjing (from 1924)

In fiction and popular culture
 Portrayed by Chen Ping in The Last Tempest (1976)
 Portrayed by Liu Jun in The Last Emperor (1987)
 Portrayed by Ching Lan in The Rise and Fall of Qing Dynasty (1992)
 Portrayed by Wang Zi in Princess Der Ling (2006)
 Portrayed by Liu Tao in The Founding of a Party (2011)
 Portrayed by Lee Yee-man in The Last Healer in Forbidden City (2016)

See also
 Ranks of imperial consorts in China#Qing
 Royal and noble ranks of the Qing dynasty

Notes

References
 

1873 births
1924 deaths
Qing dynasty imperial consorts
Manchu people
Consorts of the Guangxu Emperor